Mwajuma Hassan Khamis is a Member of Parliament in the National Assembly of Tanzania.

See also
Politics of Tanzania

External links
 Parliament of Tanzania

Year of birth missing (living people)
Living people
Members of the National Assembly (Tanzania)
Place of birth missing (living people)